John Bellenden, 2nd Lord Bellenden (died March 1707) was a Scottish nobleman.

Early life

Born John Ker, he was the fourth son of William Ker, 2nd Earl of Roxburghe (born William Drummond) and the Hon. Jane Ker.  Among his elder brothers was Robert Ker, 3rd Earl of Roxburghe (who married Lady Margaret Hay, eldest daughter of John Hay, 1st Marquess of Tweeddale) and William Ker, who served as Sheriff of Tweeddale. His younger sister, Lady Jean Ker, was married to Colin Lindsay, 3rd Earl of Balcarres, a prominent supporter of James II of England.

His parents were first cousins as his mother was the eldest daughter, and heir of line, of the Hon. Harry Ker (from his great-grandfather's second marriage to Jean Drummond, who was also his paternal grandfather's younger sister).  His maternal grandmother was Lady Margaret Hay, the only daughter of William Hay, 10th Earl of Erroll and Lady Anne Lyon (daughter of Patrick Lyon, 1st Earl of Kinghorne). After his grandfather died, Lady Margaret remarried to John Kennedy, 6th Earl of Cassilis.

He lived in Golfer's Land on the Canongate (around 500m from the Law Courts in Edinburgh), as immediate successor to its builder, John Paterson. He died in this house and was buried to the east in Holyrood Abbey. After the Union of 1707 Golfers Land became the abode of lower classes and fell into disrepair.

Titles
After his first cousin twice removed, William Bellenden, 1st Lord Bellenden, the son of Sir James Bellenden of Broughton, and Margaret Ker (daughter of Henry Ker, Lord Ker and granddaughter of Robert Ker, 1st Earl of Roxburghe), died without male issue in 1671, Ker took the surname Bellenden and became 2nd Lord Bellenden of Broughton.

Personal life
On 10 April 1683, he married the widow Lady Mary Ramsay, Countess Dowager of Dalhousie (d. 1725/6), the second daughter of Henry Moore, 1st Earl of Drogheda and the former Alice Spencer (fifth daughter of William Spencer, 2nd Baron Spencer and sister of Henry Spencer, 1st Earl of Sunderland). Lady Mary, an aunt of Henry Moore, 4th Earl of Drogheda, had previously been married to William Ramsay, 3rd Earl of Dalhousie. Together, they were the parents of seven children, including:

 John Bellenden, 3rd Lord Bellenden (1685–1740), who married Mary Parnell (1702–1792), daughter of John Parnell of Baldock.
 Hon. Mary Drummond Bellenden (1685–1736), a maid-of-honour to Caroline, Princess of Wales in 1716 and keeper of the Somerset House who married John Campbell, 4th Duke of Argyll in 1720.
 Hon Robert Bellenden (b. 1689), who died unmarried.
 Lt. Col. William Bellenden (–1759), who married Jacomina Farmer of Normington, Lincolnshire.
 Hon. James Bellenden.
 Hon. Sir Henry Bellenden (d. 1761), a governor of Hurst Castle in 1745 and Gentleman Usher of the Black Rod in 1747 who was knighted 1749.
 Hon. Margaret Bellenden, who died unmarried.

Bellenden died in March 1707 and was succeeded by his eldest son, John as the 3rd Lord Bellenden. After his death, his widow married for the third time to Dr. Samuel Collins.

Descendants
Through his eldest son John, he was a grandfather of Ker Bellenden, 4th Lord Bellenden (father of John Bellenden, 5th Lord Bellenden) and Robert Bellenden, 6th Lord Bellenden.  As the 5th Lord Bellenden died insolvent in 1796, the office of the usher of the Exchequer, which had been hereditary in the family, was sequestered and sold by his creditors.

Through his son William he was a grandfather to William Bellenden (1728–1805), who later became 7th Lord Bellenden in 1797 and the 4th Duke of Roxburghe in 1804.  Upon Williams death in 1805, the Lordship of Bellenden of Broughton became extinct.

Through his son James, he was a grandfather of Mary Bellenden, who married Sir Richard Murray, 6th Baronet.

Through his daughter Mary, he was a grandfather of Lady Caroline Campbell (1721–1803), Field Marshal John Campbell, 5th Duke of Argyll (1723–1806), Lord Frederick Campbell (1729–1816), and Lord William Campbell (1731–1778).

Family Tree

References
Notes

Sources

Year of birth missing
1707 deaths
Lords of Bellenden
Younger sons of earls